20,000 Years in Sing Sing is a 1932 American Pre-Code drama film set in Sing Sing Penitentiary, the maximum security prison in Ossining, New York, starring Spencer Tracy as an inmate and Bette Davis as his girlfriend. It was directed by Michael Curtiz and based upon the nonfiction book Twenty Thousand Years in Sing Sing, written by Lewis E. Lawes, the warden of Sing Sing from 1920 to 1941.

The film was remade by First National Pictures as Castle on the Hudson in 1940, starring John Garfield, Ann Sheridan, and Pat O'Brien.

Plot
Cocky Tommy Connors (Spencer Tracy) is sentenced from 5 to 30 years in Sing Sing for robbery and assault with a deadly weapon. His associate, Joe Finn (Louis Calhern), promises to use his contacts and influence to get him freed long before that, but his attempt to bribe the warden to provide special treatment is met with disdain and failure.

Connors makes trouble immediately, but several months confined to his cell changes his attitude somewhat. As the warden had predicted, Connors is only too glad to do some honest work on the rockpile after his enforced inactivity.

Nonetheless, his determination to break out is unshaken. Bud Saunders (Lyle Talbot), a highly educated fellow prisoner desperate to be with his pregnant wife, recruits him and Hype (Warren Hymer) for a complicated escape attempt. By chance, however, it is scheduled for a Saturday, which Connors superstitiously regards as always unlucky for him. He backs out, forcing Saunders to take another volunteer. The warden is tipped off and, though two guards are killed, the escape is foiled. Trapped, Saunders jumps to his death. His two accomplices are captured and returned to their cells.

Meanwhile, Connors' girlfriend, Fay Wilson (Bette Davis), visits him regularly in prison since his trial. On one visit, she admits she has become friendly and close to Finn in order to encourage him to help Connors, but Connors tells her that she is only giving Finn a reason to keep him locked up in jail.

The warden shows Connors a telegram that says that Wilson was injured in a car accident; there is no hope for her. Then, he gives Connors a 24-hour leave to see her; Connors promises to return, no matter what. When he sees Wilson, he learns that Finn was responsible for her injuries. He takes out a gun from a drawer, but Wilson persuades him to give her the pistol. Finn shows up, however, expecting her to sign a statement exonerating him in exchange for $5000 she intended to give to Connors. Connors attacks him. When it seems that Finn is about to kill her boyfriend, Wilson shoots him. Connors flees, taking the gun with him; Wilson secretly slips the money into his pocket. Before he dies, Finn names Connors as his killer.

The warden is lambasted in the newspapers for letting Connors go. Just when he is about to sign a letter of resignation, Connors walks in. He is found guilty of first-degree murder and sentenced to death in the electric chair, despite a recovered Wilson's testimony that she killed Finn. Connors comforts her before being taken to death row.

Cast
 Spencer Tracy as Tommy Connors
 Bette Davis as Fay Wilson
 Arthur Byron as the Warden, Paul Long
 Louis Calhern as Joe Finn
 Lyle Talbot as Bud Saunders
 Warren Hymer as Hype
 Grant Mitchell as Tester of Convicts' IQ

Production

Development
Bette Davis enjoyed working with Spencer Tracy, and had actually idolized him. The two wanted to do another movie together but never had the opportunity to do so, although they did appear together again on a radio version of Dark Victory in 1940.

Tracy, then under contract to 20th Century Fox, was lent out to Warner Brothers for the film.  It was originally intended for James Cagney, but at the time Cagney was having one of  his many misunderstandings with Jack L. Warner.

Box office
According to Warner Bros records the film earned $504,000 domestically and $431,000 foreign.

See also
 List of American films of 1932

References

External links 
 
 
 
 

1932 films
1932 crime drama films
1930s prison films
American black-and-white films
American crime drama films
American prison drama films
1930s English-language films
Films based on non-fiction books
Films directed by Michael Curtiz
Films produced by Darryl F. Zanuck
Films set in Westchester County, New York
First National Pictures films
Ossining, New York
Warner Bros. films
Films with screenplays by Robert Lord (screenwriter)
Films produced by Robert Lord (screenwriter)
1930s American films
Films scored by Bernhard Kaun